The Zeta Plain is a fertile lowland in Montenegro. It stretches from Podgorica in the north to the Skadar Lake in the south.

The name "Zeta" derives from an early root meaning "harvest" or "grain" (modern words žetva and žito).Confusingly, Zeta River flows not through the Zeta Plain but through another significant valley in Montenegro, Bjelopavlići.

Zeta Plain is one of the most densely populated areas in Montenegro. Golubovci, the capital of Golubovci urban municipality, which encompasses most of the plain, is the largest settlement. The vineyards of Plantaže, a Montenegrin quality wine producer, are situated in the plain, which is ideal for growing Mediterranean fruits and vegetables.

Zeta Plain is the site of the Podgorica Airport, as well as the Podgorica Aluminium Plant which is considered to be the worst pollutant of the plain.

References

Plains of Montenegro
Zeta (geographical region)